The 1912 United States presidential election in South Dakota took place on November 5, 1912, as part of the 1912 United States presidential election. Voters chose five representatives, or electors, to the Electoral College, who voted for president and vice president. 

South Dakota voted for the Republican nominee, former president Theodore Roosevelt, over the Democratic nominee, New Jersey Governor Woodrow Wilson, by a margin of 8.49%. 

Despite incumbent president William Howard Taft winning the national Republican nomination, the South Dakota Republican Party, under the control of progressives and heavily influenced by senator Coe I. Crawford, instead nominated electors pledged to Theodore Roosevelt, with the Progressive Party not appearing on the ballot. This selection proved controversial with conservative Taft supporting Republicans who unsuccessfully attempted to overturn the decision in court. As a result South Dakota was the only state in the 1912 election not to have president Taft either on the ballot or as a write in option (as in California). The state's other senator Robert J. Gamble, who supported Taft, predicted that the anger amongst conservative Republicans was such that many would support Woodrow Wilson purely to defeat Roosevelt. Despite this Roosevelt carried the state albeit with a much reduced margin from Taft's victory in 1908.

With 50.56% of the popular vote, South Dakota would prove to be Roosevelt's strongest state in terms of popular vote percentage in the 1912 election and the only one in which he achieved a majority of the vote. This was the only non-former Confederate state to give any candidate an absolute majority of the vote.

Results

Results by county

See also
 United States presidential elections in South Dakota

Notes

References

South Dakota
1912
1912 South Dakota elections